Brandon Mychal Smith (born May 29, 1989) is an American actor, singer, dancer, and rapper. He is best known for playing Bug Wendal in Gridiron Gang, Li'l Danny Dawkins in Phil of the Future, Nico Harris in Sonny with a Chance and So Random!, Stubby in Starstruck, Lord of da Bling in Let It Shine, and Marcus in One Big Happy. He received critical acclaim for his portrayal of Tayshawn Mitchell in The Ron Clark Story (2006) and Little Richard in the 2014 James Brown biopic Get on Up. He voices Michelangelo in the Nickelodeon animated series Rise of the Teenage Mutant Ninja Turtles.

Career
Smith won a Family Television Award and Young Artist Award in 2007 for his performance as Tayshawn in The Ron Clark Story. His other credits include the 2006 production of Gridiron Gang as Bug Wendal, and a recurring role as Mario in Unfabulous. He starred in the 2010 Disney Channel Original Movie Starstruck. He also performs the song and music video "Party Up" for Starstruck. He was a competitor on the Dancing with the Stars sequel Skating with the Stars but had to withdraw due to illness. He produced Maxrank's track "Winna Girl".

Filmography

References

External links
 TNT Profile of Brandon Smith
 

1989 births
Living people
African-American male actors
American male child actors
American male television actors
American male film actors
American male voice actors
Walt Disney Records artists
21st-century American male actors